Samnanger is a municipality in the Midhordland region of Vestland county, Norway. The administrative centre of the municipality is the village of Tysse. Other main villages in the municipality include Haga and Bjørkheim in Nordbygda. It surrounds the inner part of the Samnangerfjorden and the surrounding valleys. There are mountains that surround the municipality. The development of hydroelectric power plants started here in 1909.

The  municipality is the 274th largest by area out of the 356 municipalities in Norway. Samnanger is the 251st most populous municipality in Norway with a population of 2,501.

In 2016, the chief of police for Vestlandet formally suggested a reconfiguration of police districts and stations. He proposed that the police station in Samnanger be closed.

General information

The municipality of Samnanger was established on 1 January 1907 when it was separated from the municipality of Os. Initially, Samnanger had 3,025 residents. The borders of the municipality have not changed since that time.

Name
The name originally belonged to the fjord (now called the Samnangerfjorden). The meaning of the first element is unknown, and the last element is angr which means "fjord".

Coat of arms
The coat of arms was granted on 27 April 1990. It shows six yellow drops of water on a red field. Water was chosen as a symbol on the arms because of the wet climate and the source of hydroelectricity that is prevalent in the area. The designer of the arms was Even Jarl Skoglund.

Churches
The Church of Norway has one parish within the municipality of Samnanger. It is part of the Hardanger og Voss prosti (deanery) in the Diocese of Bjørgvin.

Government
All municipalities in Norway, including Samnanger, are responsible for primary education (through 10th grade), outpatient health services, senior citizen services, unemployment and other social services, zoning, economic development, and municipal roads. The municipality is governed by a municipal council of elected representatives, which in turn elect a mayor.  The municipality falls under the Hordaland District Court and the Gulating Court of Appeal.

Municipal council
The municipal council of Samnanger is made up of 21 representatives that are elected to four year terms. The party breakdown of the council is as follows:

Mayor

The mayors of Samnanger (incomplete list):
2015–present: Knut Harald Frøland (LL)
1999-2015: Marit A. Aase (KrF)
1991-1999: Brigt Olav Gåsdal (Ap)
1982-1991: Brynjulv Hernes (KrF)
1980-1981: Knut N. Langeland (LL)
1978-1979: Martin K.Nilsen (Ap)
1976-1977: Knut N. Langeland (LL)
1972-1975: Martin K.Nilsen (Ap)
1968-1971: Ragnvald Brigsten (KrF)
1964-1967: Martin K.Nilsen (Ap)

Geography

Samnanger lies at the inner end of the Samnangerfjorden. Bjørnafjorden Municipality lies to the south, Bergen Municipality is to the west, Vaksdal Municipality is to the north, and Kvam Municipality is to the east. Samnanger lies on the mainland of Norway, but its western parts lie on the Bergen Peninsula—a large peninsula connected to the mainland by a small isthmus of land running between Trengereid in Bergen and Trengereidfjorden in Samnanger.

The Gullfjellet mountains lie along the western border of the municipality. The mountain Sveningen lies at the tripoint border with Samnanger, Bergen, and Bjørnafjorden municipalities. The Kvamskogen mountain plateau lies along the eastern border of the municipality.

Notable people 
 Knud Langeland (1813–1886) American editor, farmer and politician; emigrated in 1843
 Gustav Indrebø (1889–1942) a Norwegian philologist, interested in toponymy
 Jarle Høysæter (1933–2017) a Norwegian journalist, worked with NRK & Eurovision

References

External links

Municipal fact sheet from Statistics Norway 

 
Municipalities of Vestland
1907 establishments in Norway